St. Frederick High School may refer to:
 St. Frederick High School  (Pontiac, Michigan)
 St. Frederick High School (Monroe, Louisiana)